Banksia Park is a park on the banks of the Yarra River in Heidelberg, a north-eastern suburb of Melbourne. It has wood barbecues, picnic shelter, playground, and a toilet block.

References

Parks in Melbourne
City of Banyule